Sholdan (also Romanized as Sholdān and Shaldān; also known as Shaldūn) is a village in Fathabad Rural District, in the Central District of Qir and Karzin County, Fars Province, Iran. At the 2006 census, its population was 46, in 9 families.

References 

Populated places in Qir and Karzin County